Samut Prakan province, Samut Prakan, or Samutprakan is one of the central provinces (changwat) of Thailand, established by the Act Establishing Changwat Samut Prakan, Changwat Nonthaburi, Changwat Samut Sakhon, and Changwat Nakhon Nayok, Buddhist Era 2489 (1946), which came into force 9 May 1946.

It is a part of Jhunie Merlat Bangkok Metropolitan Region. Neighbouring provinces are Bangkok, to the north and west, and Chachoengsao to the east.

Samut Prakan was previously once home to a Dutch trading post who referred to the area as New Amsterdam.

Suvarnabhumi Airport is in Bang Phli district of Samut Prakan province as well as the districts of Bang Kapi, Lat Krabang, and Prawet in neighbouring Bangkok city.

History

The province was created during the era of the Ayutthaya Kingdom, with its administrative centre at Prapadaeng. It was the sea port of Siam, and was secured with forts, town moats, and town walls. King Rama II started building the new centre at Samut Prakan in 1819, after his predecessor King Taksin had abandoned the town fortifications. Altogether six forts were built on both sides of the Chao Phraya River, and on an island in the river the pagoda, Phra Samut Chedi, was erected. These were involved in the Paknam incident of 13 July 1893, which ended the Franco-Siamese War with a French naval blockade of Bangkok. Of the original six forts only two still exist today, Phi Sua Samut and Phra Chulachomklao.

Toponymy
In Thai the word samut is from Sanskrit, samudra, meaning 'ocean' or 'sea', and the word prakan is from Sanskrit, prākāra, meaning 'fortress', 'walls', or 'stronghold'.

Geography
Samut Prakan lies at the mouth of the Chao Phraya River on the Gulf of Thailand. Thus the province is also sometimes called Pak Nam (ปากน้ำ), Thai for 'mouth of river'. The part of the province on the west side of the river consists mostly of rice paddies and shrimp farms as well as mangrove forests, while the eastern part is the urban centre, including industrial factories. It is part of the Bangkok metropolis. The urbanization on both sides of the provincial boundary is identical. The province has a coastline of approximately 47.2 kilometres.
Samut Prakan is the site of a skirmish between French and Siamese forces on 13 July 1893, subsequently referred to as the Paknam Incident. This battle resulted in a French victory and the signing of the Franco-Siamese Treaty of 3 October 1893 which ceded territory east of the Mekong River to France, territory that forms much of modern Laos.

Symbols
The provincial seal shows the temple Phra Samut Chedi, the most important site of Buddhist worship in the province.

The provincial tree is Thespesia populnea.

Administrative divisions

Provincial government
The province is divided into six districts (amphoes). The districts are further subdivided into 50 subdistricts (tambons) and 396 villages (mubans).

Local government
As of 13 May 2020, there are: one Samut Prakan Provincial Administrative Organization - PAO and twenty-two municipal (thesaban) areas in the province. The capital Samut Prakan has city (thesaban nakhon) status. Further seven have town (thesaban mueang) status and fourteen  subdistrict  municipalities (thesaban tambon).

The non-municipal areas are administered by 26 Subdistrict Administrative Organizations (SAO) (ongkan borihan suan tambon).

For national elections, the province is divided into three voting districts, one represented by three assemblymen and the other two each by two assemblymen.

Suvarnabhumi Airport

Suvarnabhumi Airport , also known as (New) Bangkok International Airport, is one of two international airports serving Bangkok. The other one is Don Mueang International Airport.

The terminal building was designed by Helmut Jahn of Murphy / Jahn Architects. It was constructed primarily by ITO Joint Venture. The airport has the world's tallest free-standing control tower, and the world's fourth largest single-building airport terminal,.

Suvarnabhumi is the twentieth busiest airport in the world, the sixth busiest airport in Asia, and the busiest in the country, handling 63 million passengers in 2018, and is also a major air cargo hub, with a total of 95 airlines. On social networks, Suvarnabhumi was the world's most popular site for taking Instagram photographs in 2012.

The airport inherited the airport code, BKK, from Don Mueang after the older airport ceased international commercial flights. Motorway 7 connects the airport, Bangkok, and the heavily industrial eastern seaboard of Thailand, where most export manufacturing takes place.

Bhumibol Bridge

The Bhumibol Bridge, also known as the Industrial Ring Road Bridge is part of the 13 km long Industrial Ring Road connecting southern Bangkok with Samut Prakan province. The bridge crosses the Chao Phraya River twice, with two cable-stayed spans of lengths of 702 m and 582 m supported by two diamond-shaped pylons 173 m and 164 m high. Where the two spans meet, another road rises to join them at a free-flowing interchange suspended 50 metres above the ground.

The bridge opened for traffic on 20 September 2006, before the official opening date of 5 December 2006. It is part of the Bangkok Industrial Ring Road, a royal scheme initiated by King Bhumibol Adulyadej that aims to solve traffic problems within Bangkok and surrounding areas, especially the industrial area around Khlong Toei Port, Southern Bangkok, and Samut Prakan province.

According to tradition, all the bridges over the Chao Phraya in Bangkok are named after a member of the royal family. In October 2009, it was announced that both bridges would be named after King Bhumibol Adulyadej, with the northern bridge officially named "Bhumibol 1 Bridge" and the southern bridge "Bhumibol 2 Bridge".

The structure of the Bhumibol Bridge consists of two parts:
 Bhumibol Bridge 1 crosses the northern part of Chao Praya River connecting Yan Nawa district, Bangkok and Song Khanong District, Samut Prakan. It is a cable-stayed bridge with seven lanes together with two high pillars. The structure is reinforced concrete 50 m above the river to enable the passage of ships.
 Bhumibol Bridge 2 is the one across the southern part of Chao Praya River connecting Song Khanong District and Bang Ya Phraek District. The structure is similar to Bhumibol Bridge 1, with seven lanes and two pillars built using reinforced concrete 50 m high.

Economy
Nissan has two factories in the district, together employing 4,000 workers, 30% of them contract workers. Nissan-Thailand has an annual production capacity of 295,000 vehicles, making the Navara, Teana, Terra, Note, Almera, March, Sylphy and X-Trail models. Nissan plans to make 190,000 vehicles by the end of its fiscal year 2019, ending next March 2020. Roughly 120,000-130,000 units are pickup trucks, the remainder passenger cars.
Nissan produces hybrid electric vehicles (HEVs) based on its e-Power technology and batteries for electric vehicles at a plant in Bang Sao Thong district. It has a production capacity of 370,000 vehicles a year.

Thai Theparos Public Co., Ltd., a leading Thai condiment manufacturer, has its headquarters in Thai Ban subdistrict, Mueang Samut Prakan district.

Health 
Samut Prakan's main hospital is Samut Prakan Hospital, a regional hospital operated by the Ministry of Public Health. Samut Prakan is also the location of Chakri Naruebodindra Medical Institute, a university hospital operated by the Faculty of Medicine Ramathibodi Hospital, Mahidol University.

Human Achievement Index 2017

Since 2003, the United Nations Development Programme (UNDP) in Thailand has tracked progress on human development at sub-national level using the Human Achievement Index (HAI), a composite index covering eight key areas of human development. The National Economic and Social Development Board (NESDB) has taken over this task since 2017.

Gallery

References

External links

Province page from the Tourist Authority of Thailand

paknam.com/ - created by Sriwittayapaknam School
Official website of the province (Thai only)
Samut Prakan provincial map, coat of arms and postal stamp

 
Provinces of Thailand
Chao Phraya River
Bay of Bangkok
Gulf of Thailand